A dambo is a class of complex shallow wetlands in central, southern and eastern Africa, particularly in Zambia, Malawi and Zimbabwe. They are generally found in higher rainfall flat plateau areas and have river-like branching forms which in themselves are not very large but combined add up to a large area. Dambos have been estimated to comprise 12.5% of the area of Zambia. Similar African words include mbuga (commonly used in East Africa), matoro (Mashonaland), vlei (South Africa), fadama (Nigeria), and bolis (Sierra Leone); the French bas-fond and German Spültal have also been suggested as referring to similar grassy wetlands.

Characteristics
Dambos are characterised by grasses, rushes and sedges, contrasting with surrounding woodland such as miombo woodland. They may be substantially dry at the end of the dry season, revealing grey soils or black clays, but unlike a flooded grassland, they retain wet lines of drainage through the dry season. They are inundated (waterlogged) in the wet season but not generally above the height of the vegetation, and any open water surface is usually confined to streams and small ponds or lagoons (called pans) at the lowest point generally near the centre.

The name dambo is most frequently used for wetlands on flat plateaus which form the headwaters of streams. The definition for scientific purposes has been proposed as “seasonally waterlogged, predominantly grass covered, depressions bordering headwater drainage lines”.

Types
The problem with the preceding definition is that the word may also be used for wetlands bordering rivers far from the headwaters, for example the dambo of the Mbereshi River where it enters the swamps of the Luapula River in Zambia, . 

A 1998 report of the Food and Agriculture Organization distinguishes between ‘hydromorphic/phreatic’ dambos (associated with headwaters) and ‘fluvial’ dambos (associated with rivers), and also referred to five geomorphological types in Zambia’s Luapula Province: upland, valley, hanging, sand dune and pan dambos.

Hydrology
Dambos are fed by rainfall which drains out slowly to feed streams and are therefore a vital part of the water cycle. As well as being complex ecosystems, they also play a role in the biodiversity of the region.

There is a popular idea that dambos act like sponges to soak up the wet season rain which they release slowly into rivers during the dry season thus ensuring a year-round flow, but this is opposed by some research which suggests that in the middle to late dry season the water is actually released from aquifers. Springs are seen in some dambos. Thus it may take a long time—perhaps several years—for water from a heavy rainy season to percolate through hills and emerge in a dambo, creating lagoons there or a flow in downstream rivers which cannot be explained by the previous year's rainfall. Dambos may be involved, for instance, in explaining puzzling variations in water level or flow in Lake Mweru Wantipa and Lake Chila in Mbala.

Use

Traditionally, dambos have been exploited:
 as a dry-season water source
 for rushes used as thatching and fencing material
 for clay used for building, brick-making and earthenware
 for hunting (especially birds and small antelope)
 for growing vegetables and other food crops, which can be vital in drought years since dambo soils usually retain enough moisture to produce a harvest when the rains fail 
 for soaking bitter cassava in dug ponds
 for fishing (generally using fish traps) in those dambos with streams

More recently, they have been used for fish ponds and growing upland rice. Efforts to develop dambos agriculturally have been hampered by a lack of research on the hydrology and soils of dambos, which have proved to be variable and complex.

Example

Unlike in the neighbouring areas which have been cleared for farming and charcoal-burning, the dambo contrasts well with the undisturbed miombo woodland canopy. Headwater dambos have a branching structure like rivers. Most of the dambos have roughly the same width and form the same sort of pattern.

The water in the pan has dried out, and the grass has been burnt off giving the dark appearance at the centre of the dambo. To the east and west of the pan dambo a series of dambos can be seen along two river courses.

References

Wetlands
Landforms
Wetlands of Zambia
Wetlands of Zimbabwe